Leonard Benbow (3 May 1876 – 1946) was an English footballer who played in the Football League for Nottingham Forest and Stoke.

Benbow played for Oswestry United and Shrewsbury Town before joining Nottingham Forest in 1897. He won the 1898 FA Cup with Forest and scored 22 goals for the club in 62 games. He spent the 1900–01 season at Stoke scored four goals in 24 matches and ended his career with Northampton Town.

Career
Benbow was born in Oswestry and played for his local team Oswestry United and then nearby Shrewsbury Town. Benbow's performances in the Birmingham League for Shrewsbury earned him a move to Nottingham Forest in 1897. In his first season with Forest he enjoyed a large amount of success as he scored 13 goals and played in the 1898 FA Cup Final as Forest beat Derby County to lift the cup. In 1898–99 He scored eight goals in 27 matches and in 1899–1900 managed just one in six as he found himself out of favour.

He joined Stoke for the 1900–01 season and his signing was met with approval from the club's supporters. But he failed to live up to the hype and he managed just two goals in the league both coming against Newcastle United in January 1901. He was allowed to leave the club at the end of the season and Benbow went to Northampton Town.

Career statistics

Honours
 Nottingham Forest
 FA Cup winner: 1898

References

English footballers
Nottingham Forest F.C. players
Northampton Town F.C. players
Stoke City F.C. players
Shrewsbury Town F.C. players
English Football League players
1876 births
1946 deaths
Sportspeople from Oswestry
Association football forwards
FA Cup Final players